Anthidium vigintiduopunctatum is a species of bee in the family Megachilidae, the leaf-cutter, carder, or mason bees.

Distribution
Argentina
Ecuador
Peru

References

vigintiduopunctatum
Insects described in 1904